Blue on blue may refer to:

Music 
 "Blue on Blue" (song), a 1963 hit song recorded by Bobby Vinton
 Blue on Blue (Bobby Vinton album), 1963
 Blue on Blue (Leigh Nash album), 2006
 "Blue on Blue", a song by James Blunt from Moon Landing
 "Blue on Blue", a song by the Pet Shop Boys on the "Minimal" DVD

Television 
 "Blue on Blue" (Ugly Betty), an episode of Ugly Betty
 "Blue on Blue" (Under the Dome), an episode of Under the Dome

Other 
Blue on Blue: An Insider's Story of Good Cops Catching Bad Cops, 2017
Friendly fire (inadvertent firing toward friendly forces), called "blue on blue" in NATO terminology